The dragonhunter (Hagenius brevistylus) is a clubtail dragonfly of the eastern United States and southeastern Canada. 

Males can be distinguished at a distance by their habit of curling their abdomens under while flying, forming a sideways J shape.

The dragonhunter is the only member of genus Hagenius. Its closest relatives are Asian dragonflies of genus Sieboldius, which are also sometimes called "dragonhunters". Together, the two genera form the subfamily Hageniinae.

The nymph is unusual, with a very flat, wide body. It is slow-moving and lives among bark and leaf litter at the edges of streams, where its dark color provides camouflage.

The adult feeds on large insects, including darner and clubtail dragonflies, sometimes ambushing them from above.  It also takes monarch butterflies, eating the thorax and abdomen first to avoid the greatest concentration of cardenolide toxins.

References

External links

Hagenius brevistylus , BugGuide

Gomphidae